The 2019 Liga de Elite was the 47th season of the Liga de Elite, the top Macanese league for association football clubs since its establishment in 1973. The season began on 23 January 2019 and ended on 14 July 2019.

League table

Results

See also
2019 Taça de Macau

References

External links
Macau Football Association 

Campeonato da 1ª Divisão do Futebol seasons
Macau
1